Hasharabad (also Romanized as Ḩasharābād) is a village in Rigan Rural District, in the Central District of Rigan County, Kerman Province, Iran. At the 2006 census, its population was 412, in 98 families.

References 

Populated places in Rigan County